Michael Edward Marcos Keon (born September 22, 1954) is a Filipino politician. Keon is the son of Australian journalist Michael James Keon and Elizabeth E. Marcos-Keon, governor of Ilocos Norte from 1971 to 1983 and the nephew of former Philippine president Ferdinand Marcos.

His mother, the first female vice-governor and governor of Ilocos Norte, was the sister of former Philippine president Ferdinand Marcos. His father worked for the United Nations Food and Agricultural Organization and had a hand in setting up the International Rice Research Institute in Los Baños, Laguna.  His father also joined the historic 10,000-km. "Long March" with Mao Zedong during the Chinese Revolution, covering the monumental event for the Chicago Daily Tribune.

Before entering politics, Keon worked in the sports sector as director of the Gintong Alay program. This project was launched on October 31, 1979 and was intended to ensure the success of Philippine sports to promote and ultimately to achieve gold medals in international events.

Political career 

He served as provincial governor of Ilocos Norte from 2007-2010. He was preceded by cousin, Bongbong Marcos and was succeeded by Imee Marcos.

He initially planned to run as mayor of Laoag for 2013 elections but withdrew after Bongbong Marcos convinced him to withdraw his candidacy in favor of then-ABC President Chevylle V. Fariñas, wife of the then-outgoing Mayor Michael V. Fariñas.

In 2018, Keon was appointed by Ilocos Norte Governor Imee Marcos as Laoag City Councilor to fill in a vacant position in the Laoag City Council.

In 2019 elections, he again ran for the same position; this time with the support of the Marcos clan. He defeated the incumbent mayor Chevylle Fariñas. His victory signaled the end of decades-old rule of the Fariñas clan in the city.

References 

1954 births
Living people
Governors of Ilocos Norte
Marcos family
People from Ilocos Norte
Ilocano people
Filipino people of Australian descent
Filipino sports executives and administrators
Lakas–CMD politicians